Anabarilius yangzonensis is a species of cyprinid fish in the family Xenocyprididae that is currently critically endangered. They can only be found in Yangzong Lake of Yunnan, China.

References

yangzonensis
Cyprinid fish of Asia
Freshwater fish of China
Endemic fauna of Yunnan
Endangered fish
Fish described in 1980